Takis Evdokas (19 June 1928 – 12 February 2020) was a Greek Cypriot far-right politician, psychiatrist and writer. He was the founder of the Democratic National Party which advocated union of Cyprus and Greece (Enosis).

References

1928 births
2020 deaths
People from Limassol
Leaders of political parties in Cyprus
Greek Cypriot writers
Cypriot politicians